The VI. Internationales ADAC 1000 Kilometer Rennen took place on 22 May, on the Nürburgring Nordschleife, (West Germany). It was the fourth round of the F.I.A. World Sports Car Championship. This was also the third round of the FIA GT Cup.

Report

Entry

A massive total of 85 racing cars were registered for this event, of which 73 arrived for practice and 67 started the long distance race on the 14.174 mile German circuit. David Brown won the event in 1957 and again in 1958 and 1959 but had withdrawn from Sports Car racing, leaving its lead driver, Stirling Moss without a works drive. He hope to complete his hat-trick of race wins on the Nordschleife, laid with the American outfit, Camoradi USA with their Maserati Tipo 61. As for championship leaders, Porsche, this was their home event arrived with two different cars; 356 B and 718 RS 60 for their squad of drivers led by Olivier Gendebien and Jo Bonnier.

Scuderia Ferrari would head the Italian challenge. Ferrari had four works 250 TR 59/60s in the Eifel mountains, Cliff Allison, Willy Mairesse, Phil Hill and Wolfgang von Trips were amongst the squad of drivers. They were joined a fleet of privateer drivers in their Alfa Romeos, Porsche 356A Carreras Oscas and other mainline sports and GT cars.

Race

 
A crowd of approximately 250,000 in attendance came to witness the race, despite a day of rain.

As for the race, victory went to the Maserati Tipo 61 of Moss and Gurney, gaining the Englishman his third win in a row in the mountains. The winning partnership, won in a time of 7hr 31:40.5 mins., averaging a speed of 82.843 mph. The margin of triumph over the Porsche of Bonnier/Gendebein was 2 mins 52secs.

Official Classification

Class Winners are in Bold text.

 Fastest Lap: Stirling Moss, 9:37.0secs (88.431 mph)

Class Winners

Standings after the race

FIA World Sportscar Championship

Note: Only the top five positions are included in this set of standings.Championship points were awarded for the first six places in each race in the order of 8-6-4-3-2-1. Manufacturers were only awarded points for their highest finishing car with no points awarded for positions filled by additional cars. Only the best 3 results out of the 5 races could be retained by each manufacturer. Points earned but not counted towards the championship totals are listed within brackets in the above table.

References

Nurburgring
6 Hours of Nürburgring
Nurburgring